Spring Romance may refer to:

Spring Romance, album by Dan Gibson 1998
Spring Romance (EP) from the band Bend Sinister
"Spring Romance", song by the Finnish hard rock band Stala & so from It Is So